Juan Lindolfo de los Reyes Cuestas (6 January 1837 – 21 June 1905) was a Uruguayan politician who served as the 18th President of Uruguay from 1897 until 1899 and for a second term from 1899 to 1903.

Background
Juan Lindolfo Cuestas was a prominent member of the Uruguayan Colorado Party, which dominated the country's politics for over a century. He was Minister of Finance from 1875 to 1876 and from 1880 to 1882. He served as Minister of Justice and Education from 1884 to 1886.

His son, Juan Cuestas, was a diplomat.

President of Uruguay

First term
Lindolfo Cuestas first assumed the Presidency in crisis circumstances . On August 25, 1897 the sitting President of Uruguay, Juan Idiarte Borda was assassinated by a gunman, Avelino Arredondo. Lindolfo Cuestas as the President of the Senate of Uruguay became president.

Within two years Lindolfo Cuestas had ceded the Presidency to José Batlle y Ordóñez on an interim basis.

Second term
He soon reassumed the office, however, and served until 1903, when he again stepped down in favour of José Batlle y Ordóñez.

Political background

Lindolfo Cuestas's periods of Presidential office were characterized by crises, not only originating from the assassination of Idiarte, but also by internal dissension within the Colorado Party and by strife with the Opposition Blanco Party, which continued to propel the country into outbreaks of the intermittent Civil War which beset Uruguay throughout the mid- to late- 19th century.

Post presidency
After relinquishing the Presidency for the second time, in 1903, the country soon slipped into civil war, the decisive battle of which was the Battle of Masoller in 1904. Lindolfo Cuestas died in 1905.

See also
 Colorado Party (Uruguay)#Earlier History
 Politics of Uruguay
 List of political families#Uruguay

References

 :es:Juan Lindolfo Cuestas

People from Paysandú
Presidents of Uruguay
Presidents of the Senate of Uruguay
Education and Culture Ministers of Uruguay
Uruguayan people of Spanish descent
1837 births
1905 deaths
Ministers of Economics and Finance of Uruguay
Colorado Party (Uruguay) politicians